Johanna  (born 20 November 1925) is a German gymnast who, on 12 April 2012, was certified by Guinness World Records as the world's oldest active competitive gymnast. At the age of 86 when breaking the record,  was a regular competitor in the amateur competition  (State Senior Games) in Saxony. She became known worldwide when on 26 March 2012, YouTube user LieveDaffy uploaded two videos of  performing gymnastics routines: one on the parallel bars and one on the floor. The clips became viral videos, and within six days of posting had generated over 1.1 million views each. In addition to being recognized by Guinness World Records,  has received the Nadia Comăneci Sportsmanship Award from the International Gymnastics Hall of Fame.

Viral videos 

The clips became viral videos, and within six days of posting had generated over 1.1 million views each. Her story also was covered in at least 188 Chinese newspapers. , the parallel bars video had received over 3.7 million views, and the floor video over 3.8 million views.

Early life and education 

She was an active child and often would climb tall bars and roll on the mats. She began gymnastics at an early age, first competing at about age ten, but soon her family moved to a different part of Germany, temporarily ending her participation in competitions. When she was eleven, she began Nazi Germany's required social service work for girls during World War II during which she worked in farming and took care of the children of another family.

She was unable to work in gymnastics at that time, however, because it had been banned in East Germany during the first two years of post-World War II Allied occupation. In 1950, she studied at the University of Halle to become a sports teacher.

Career 

 
Although gymnastics was no longer banned in East Germany,  continued to play handball as well and was a member of the team that won the Eastern German Championship in 1954.

 turned her attention to coaching youth girls' gymnastics and, with trainer , led the team to become German Youth Champions in 1957. Her gymnasts included Barbara Dix-Stolz and Christel Felgner-Wunder, who finished fourth place in the 1964 Summer Olympics in Tokyo.

In 1981, at age 56,  returned to active gymnastics in a "manner suitable for senior citizens" and began competing in the German gymnastics festivals Senior group.

In 2011, she ended her participation in national championships, and in 2012, she was still a regular competitor in the amateur  (State Senior Games) in Saxony. Additionally, on 2 November 2013, at the 28th  (Cottbus Gymnastics Memorial), she won what she then said was her last gymnastics competition. According to senior gymnast , the purpose of the Memorial is to "'commemorate those who are no longer there and honor those who keep themselves fit and capable of everyday life through gymnastics on the apparatus until old age'".

In June 2016, she again announced that she would compete one final time that August at the traditional  ( Gymnastics Festival) in Freyburg. She continued to start on the floor exercises, bench, parallel bars, and high bar. Although not during a competition, in April 2017, she performed a parallel bars routine on a men's Olympic set at the 8th International Ageing Asia Innovation Forum in Singapore.

After a torn biceps tendon in 2018, she stopped performing active or competitive gymnastics, but she could still stand on her head at age 95.

Awards and recognition 

On 12 April 2012,  received an entry in the Guinness World Records as the world's oldest active competitive gymnast.

She was invited by the International Gymnastics Training Camp and the American Turners New York to perform her bars routine on the latter's float in the 57th German-American Steuben Parade on 20 September 2014. The parade procession lasted an hour, and  performed her routine six times while on the float.

On 16 May 2015, she was awarded the Nadia Comăneci Sportsmanship Award from the International Gymnastics Hall of Fame.

 was recognized on Steve Harvey's television show Little Big Shots: Forever Young during the episode that aired 5 July 2017 where she performed her parallel bars routine. Biles said that ' performance left her "speechless".

Quotes 

 has several quotes attributed to her, including, "If you are fit, it is easier to master life", "When there is movement, there is life", "My face is old but my heart is young", and "Maybe the day I stop doing gymnastics is the day I die".

Personal life 

Johanna  married gymnast coach  in 1963. Her personal nickname is "", and she has been nicknamed "" ("Gymnastics Grandma") by the press.

She dedicated the jump to Queen Elizabeth II who also was ninety during that year.  was quoted as saying, "", in English, "I respect her life's work and adore her very much". ' tandem jumping partner was Olympic gymnastics medalist .

 has experienced several injuries unrelated to gymnastics. She had a bike fall in the spring of 2014 that left her temporarily unable to use gym equipment. At that time, she also reported that she was having some problems with a shoulder caused by a torn tendon, but the cause of the tear was not given. She has osteoarthritis in her left knee, and while performing a task unrelated to sports, she experienced a tendon tear in her left biceps in early November 2018, which kept her from participating in gymnastics at the 2018  and in device gymnastics at the 97th  in 2019. As reported by GYMmedia, with quotes from :

In English:

In April 2021,  reported that she had received her first COVID-19 vaccine. On 20 November 2021, her 96th birthday, she belatedly celebrated her 95th with a party that had been canceled because of the pandemic.

Notes

References

External links 
 Johanna Quaas Fanpage on Facebook
 Record in The Guinness Book

1925 births
Living people
People from Burgenlandkreis
German female artistic gymnasts
Guinness World Records
Sportspeople from Saxony-Anhalt